Alexandrina Maria da Costa (30 March 1904 – 13 October 1955), best known as Blessed Alexandrina of Balazar, was a Portuguese mystic and victim soul, member of the Association of Salesian Cooperators, who was born and died in Balazar (a rural parish of Póvoa de Varzim). On 25 April 2004 she was declared blessed by Pope John Paul II who stated that "her secret to holiness was love for Christ".

Early life

Alexandrina Maria da Costa was born on 30 March 1904, in Balazar, a rural parish of Póvoa de Varzim, Portugal. Her father abandoned the family when she was very young. She had only eighteen months' schooling before being sent to work on a farm at the age of nine. In her teens she started to work in Balazar as a seamstress along with her sister.

Alexandrina said that when she went with other girls to the countryside, she picked flowers that she later used to make flower carpets to the Church of Our Lady of Sorrows in Póvoa de Varzim. One day, she started bleeding from her head, due to a crown of spines, she said.

At 14 years old, in March 1918 an incident changed her life. Her former employer along with two other men tried to break into her room to rape her. To escape them, Alexandrina jumped  down from a window, barely surviving. Her spine was broken from the fall. Until age 19, Alexandrina was still able to "drag herself" to church where, hunched over, she would remain in prayer, to the great amazement of the parishioners. During the early years, Alexandrina asked the Blessed Mother for the grace of a cure. She suffered gradual paralysis that confined her to bed from 1925 onward. She remained bed-ridden for about 30 years.

The parish priest lent her a statue of the Immaculate Heart of Mary for the month of May. She asked for a little altar to be fixed to the wall by her bed where it was graced with the statue of Our Lady of Fatima and decorated with flowers and candles.

Later life
In June 1938, based on the request of Alexandrina's confessor, Mariano Pinho, several bishops from Portugal wrote to Pope Pius XI, asking him to consecrate the world to the Immaculate Heart of Mary. This request was renewed several times until 1941, in which the Holy See asked three times for information about Alexandrina to be supplied by the Archbishop of Braga.

In 1938 Cardinal Eugenio Pacelli was the secretary of the state of the Vatican, and he became Pope Pius XII in early March, 1939. In 1942 he performed the consecration of the world.

After December 1938, Alexandrina corresponded regularly with Lucia Santos.

She was examined by medical doctors, with no conclusion.

Based on the advice of a priest, her sister kept a diary of Alexandrina's words and mystical experiences. According to her Vatican autobiography, Jesus spoke to her, at one point saying:  "You will very rarely receive consolation... I want that while your heart is filled with suffering, on your lips there is a smile". In 1944, she joined the "Union of Salesian Cooperators", offering her suffering for the salvation of souls and for the sanctification of youth.

Umberto Pasquale (1906 – 1985) was a Salesian priest and writer. At the beginning of the 1930s, he went to Portugal and in 1944 he met Alexandrina Maria da Costa, the main subject of his books.

Tombstone

Based on her request, the following words were written on her tombstone:
"Sinners, if the dust of my body can be of help to save you, come close, walk over it, kick it around until it disappears. But never sin again:  do not offend Jesus anymore! Sinners, how much I want to tell you.... Do not risk losing Jesus for all eternity, for he is so good. Enough with sin. Love Jesus, love him!".

See also
 First Thursdays Devotion
 Pope Pius XII 1942 consecration to the Immaculate Heart of Mary
 Mary of the Divine Heart Droste zu Vischering

References

Further reading
 Madigan, Leo; Blessed Alexandrina da Costa: The Mystical Martyr of Fatima. Fatima-Ophel Books, Fátima, Portugal (2005).
 Johnston, Francis W.; Alexandrina: The Agony and the Glory. Saint Benedict Press, TAN Books (2009).
 Rowles, Kevin. Blessed Alexandrina - Living Miracle of the Eucharist. Twickenham, United Kingdom (2006)
 Amorth, Gabriele; Dietro un sorriso. Beata Alexandrina Maria da Costa. Elledici, Italy.
 Pinho, Mariano; No Calvário de Balasar: Alexandrina Maria da Costa. Editorial Apostolado da Oração, Braga, Portugal (2005).
 Silva, Manuel Fernando Sousa e; Caminhos de Balasar: Biografia da Beata Alexandrina. Paulinas Editora, Prior Velho, Portugal (2010)

External links 
 Sanctuary of Alexandrina of Balazar – Official website

1904 births
1955 deaths
People from Póvoa de Varzim
Portuguese beatified people
Portuguese Christian mystics
Portuguese Roman Catholic saints
20th-century Christian mystics
Roman Catholic mystics
Beatifications by Pope John Paul II
Venerated Catholics by Pope John Paul II